Wanggamala, also spelt Wanggamanha, Wangkamahdla, Wangkamadla, Wangkamanha, Wangkamana, Wonkamala, Wongkamala, Wonkamudla, and other variants, is an extinct Australian Aboriginal language of the Pama–Nyungan family, previously spoken in the Northern Territory around Hay River (east of Alice Springs) and to the south of the Andegerebinha-speaking area.

As of 2003, there was one speaker remaining.

According to Gavan Breen (2007), Lanima (AIATSIS code G52) and Yurlayurlanya (formerly spelt Ulaolinya) are groups whose dialect is Wangkamanha  G1, or possibly two names for the same group. Other linguists have offered different interpretations of the dialects.

Wangka-Yutjurru (AIATSIS G5) is a separate language (also Karnic, according to Luise Hercus, according to Gavan Breen, which  has two dialects, Wangka-Yutjurru and Wangkamanha. Other linguists suggest further dialects.

Alternative names

Tharlimanha (Breen 2007)
Wanggamala (AIATSIS and Ethnologue)
Wanggamanha
Wangkamadla
Wangkamahdla
Wangkamala
Wangkamana (Horton, after Tindale; Blake & Breen 1971)
Wangkamanha
Wonggaman (AIAS)
Wonggawan
Wongkamala (Tindale)
 Wonkamala (Tindale 1974)
 Wonkamudla(Tindale 1974; O'Grady et al 1996; Mathews)

References

Karnic languages